are a Japanese hard rock band started in 2000 on the Avex Mode label. Originally, it consisted of only three instrumentalists who invited different vocalists periodically. But in 2006, Ricky (formerly of Dasein) joined the group full-time as vocalist.

The group was formed in order to provide songs for the popular Kamen Rider Series, and was the official band of the Kamen Rider shows from 2000 to 2007, according to the CD jackets.

Members
 – guitar
 – bass
 – drums
Ricky – vocals
 – keyboards, arranger

Discography

Albums
 
 
 
Album released independently

Singles
 "Power Child" (December 1, 2000)
 featuring Hiroshi Fujioka
"Power Child" featuring ROLLY
 featuring Hiroshi Fujioka

 "Deep Breath" (August 18, 2001)
The title track was used as the third ending theme song for Kamen Rider Agito
"Deep Breath" featuring ROLLY
"Sitting On the Dynamite" featuring Jin Hashimoto
"Touch" featuring ROLLY and Jin Hashimoto
"Deep Breath (Original Karaoke)"
"Sitting on the Dynamite (Original Karaoke)"
"Touch (Original Karaoke)"
  (August 7, 2002)
Features  on vocals
The title track was used as the second ending theme song for Kamen Rider Ryuki

"Gravitation"

"Gravitation (Original Karaoke)"
 "The people with no name" (July 24, 2003)
The title track was used as the second ending theme song for Kamen Rider 555
"The people with no name" featuring m.c.A.T
"All eyez on me" featuring Natsuki Katō
"The people with no name (Original Karaoke)"
"All eyez on me (Original Karaoke)"
"The people with no name ~Rap No. 1 version~" (August 20, 2003)
"The people with no name ~Rap No. 1 version~" featuring m.c.A.T
 featuring Kenji Ohtsuki
"The People with No Name ~Rap No. 1 version~ (Original Karaoke)"

  (February 18, 2004)
Features m.c.A.T on vocals
The title track is a cover of the first ending theme song for Kamen Rider

"The Last Card"

"The Last Card (Original Karaoke)"
 "ELEMENTS" (September 29, 2004)
Features Ricky on vocals
The title track was used as the second opening theme song for Kamen Rider Blade
"ELEMENTS"

"ELEMENTS (Original Karaoke)"

 "Full Force" (April 5, 2006)
 The title track is used as the first ending theme song for Kamen Rider Kabuto
"Full Force"
"Bang! Bang! Revolution"
"Full Force (Instrumental with chorus)"
"Bang! Bang! Revolution (Instrumental with chorus)"
 "Lord of the Speed" (November 1, 2006)
 features 
 the title track is used as the second ending theme song for Kamen Rider Kabuto
"Lord of the Speed"
"Lord of the Speed (Instrumental with chorus)"
"Lord of the Speed (Re-mix Ver.)"
  (August 1, 2008)
 First independent single
"Kodoku o Fumitsubuse"

 "Ride a firstway" (September 16, 2009)
 The title track is used as the theme for Pachinko Kamen Rider MAX EDITION
"Ride a firstway"
"Dreamer"
"Ride a firstway instrumental"
"Dreamer instrumental"
 "“Blessed Wind" (November 21, 2012)
Both songs are used for Kamen Rider Wizard as themes for the main character's Hurricane and Land Styles, respectively. The single is released together with “Last Engage” by Kamen Rider Girls, which contains the themes for Wizard's Flame and Water Styles.
"Blessed Wind"
"Strength of the Earth"

Other releases
 "Flashback" (31 August 2005)
The title track performed by Rin' featuring m.c.A.T was used as the theme song for Kamen Rider Hibiki & The Seven Senki. RIDER CHIPS provided the B-side titled "Flashback -RIDER CHIPS version-".
 Masked Rider series Theme song Re-Product CD SONG ATTACK First featuring KUUGA KIVA RYUKI (20 May 2009)
Features the following tracks by RIDER CHIPS:
~ featuring Masayuki Tanaka
"Break the Chain Ver.RIDER CHIPS" featuring Tourbillon
"Alive A life Ver.RIDER CHIPS" featuring Rica Matsumoto
 Masked Rider series Theme song Re-Product CD SONG ATTACK RIDE Second featuring BLADE 555 AGITΩ (24 June 2009)
Features the following tracks by RIDER CHIPS:
"Round ZERO～BLADE BRAVE Ver.RIDER CHIPS" featuring Nanase Aikawa
"Justiφ's Ver.RIDER CHIPS" featuring ISSA
 featuring Shinichi Ishihara
 Masked Rider series Theme song Re-Product CD SONG ATTACK RIDE Third featuring DEN-O KABUTO HIBIKI (22 July 2009)
Features the following tracks by RIDER CHIPS:
"Climax Jump Ver.RIDER CHIPS" featuring AAA Den-O Form
"Next Level Ver.RIDER CHIPS" featuring  YU-KI
 featuring Akira Fuse
 Kamen Rider Build Theme Songs & Insert Songs Collection (2018)
Features the following tracks by RIDER CHIPS:
Law of the Victory
 Heisei Kamen Rider 20 Titles Commemoration Best (1 May 2019)
Features the following tracks by RIDER CHIPS:
Kamen Rider Kuuga! (with Masayuki Tanaka)
EXCITE (RIDER CHIPS ver.)
Kamen Rider Zi-O Main Theme & Insert Song Best Song Collection
Features the following tracks by RIDER CHIPS:
Next New Wφrld

External links 
Official website(In Japanese)
RIDER CHIPS at Avex Group(In Japanese)

Kamen Rider
Japanese hard rock musical groups
Japanese rock music groups
Avex Group artists